Xu Qin (born October 1961) is a Chinese politician, and the current Communist Party Secretary of Heilongjiang. Previously he had served as governor of Hebei, and before that, mayor, then party chief of Shenzhen, China's most prominent special economic zone.

Career
Xu Qin was born in Lianyungang, Jiangsu province, in 1961. He was admitted to the Beijing Institute of Technology in October 1978 to study photoelectric engineering. After graduating in 1982, he was assigned by the state to Factory 559 (later part of Norinco), a military contractor, to conduct scientific research with military applications. He returned to BIT two years later to study for a master's degree. In 1987, after obtaining his master's, he joined the National Planning Commission (the antecedent of the National Development and Reform Commission), embarking on a career as a public servant with technical skills.  

Xu worked for the next twenty years in the economic planning system, supporting state-run industries related to electrical mechanics. In 2001, he entered the Guanghua School of Management to obtain an MBA. In 2003, he began overseeing high-tech planning as part of the National Development and Reform Commission. In 2004 he received a doctorate from the Hong Kong Polytechnic University.

In April 2008, he was transferred to the Special Economic Zone of Shenzhen to become executive vice mayor. In June 2010, he was named Mayor of Shenzhen. Xu was mayor during the 2015 Shenzhen landslide, an industrial accident later deemed to have been caused by human factors. He apologized on behalf of the government for the incident, bowing to the public to acknowledge his responsibility. On December 31, 2016, after Ma Xingrui was moved to the post of Governor of Guangdong, Xu was named party chief of Shenzhen. He served as party chief and mayor for a few months simultaneously.

In April 2017, Xu was transferred to Hebei as deputy party chief and governor-designate, duly was confirmed as Governor of Hebei by the provincial People's Congress on April 26, 2017. He will oversee the planning of the Xiong'an New Area and integration of the Beijing-Tianjin-Hebei economic area.

On October 18, 2021, he was transferred to northeast China's Heilongjiang province and appointed Communist Party Secretary of Heilongjiang.

References

External links
Asia Pacific Cities Summit profile

Living people
Governors of Hebei
People's Republic of China politicians from Jiangsu
Political office-holders in Guangdong
Politicians from Lianyungang
1961 births
Beijing Institute of Technology alumni
Alumni of the Hong Kong Polytechnic University
Delegates to the 12th National People's Congress
Delegates to the 11th National People's Congress
Members of the 19th Central Committee of the Chinese Communist Party
CCP committee secretaries of Heilongjiang